Clavigesta is a genus of moths belonging to the subfamily Olethreutinae of the family Tortricidae.

Species
Clavigesta purdeyi (Durrant, 1911)
Clavigesta sylvestrana (Curtis, 1850)

See also
List of Tortricidae genera

References

External links
tortricidae.com

Tortricidae genera
Olethreutinae